Central News may refer to:

 ITV News Central, a regional television news and current affairs programme for the English Midlands previously known as Central News
 Central News Agency (disambiguation), a number of agencies